"Your Heart" is a song by American rappers Joyner Lucas and J. Cole, released on September 24, 2021 with an accompanying music video. It was produced by Palaze, LC, and Hagan. The song sees Lucas and Cole expressing regret for breaking their respective partners' hearts by being unfaithful and causing their relationships to end.

Lyrics
In the song, Lucas admits to infidelity in a past relationship, criticizing himself ("I broke your heart, huh? / You knew I was a fuck nigga from the start, huh? / You should've listened when they said I was a dawg, huh? / You should've listened to your head when you had thoughts, huh?"). In his verse, J. Cole also admits to cheating on his partner and blames himself for losing her to someone else ("I hate a fuck nigga, used to be a fuck nigga / Couldn't even blame her if she did fuck niggas").

Charts

Certifications

References

2021 singles
2021 songs
Joyner Lucas songs
J. Cole songs
Songs written by Joyner Lucas
Songs written by J. Cole
Songs about heartache
Songs about infidelity